The 2011/12 FIS Ski Flying World Cup was the 15th official World Cup season in ski flying awarded with small crystal globe as the subdiscipline of FIS Ski Jumping World Cup.

Calendar

Men

Men's team

Standings

Ski Flying

Nations Cup unofficial

Notes

References 

World cup
FIS Ski Flying World Cup